Crucifixion of Saint Peter refers to the death of Saint Peter

It may also refer to:
Crucifixion of Saint Peter (Caravaggio), a 1600 painting by Caravaggio
The Crucifixion of St. Peter (Michelangelo), a 1540s fresco painting by Michelangelo

See also
Cross of St. Peter